Ray Township is one of thirteen townships in Franklin County, Indiana. As of the 2010 census, its population was 4,021.

History
Ray Township is named for James B. Ray, fourth Governor of Indiana.

The Oldenburg Historic District and Stockheughter Covered Bridge are listed on the National Register of Historic Places.

Geography

Cities and towns
 Batesville (north quarter)
 Oldenburg

Unincorporated towns
 Hamburg
 Huntersville
(This list is based on USGS data and may include former settlements.)

Adjacent townships
 Salt Creek Township (north)
 Butler Township (east)
 Adams Township, Ripley County (southeast)
 Laughery Township, Ripley County (south)
 Salt Creek Township, Decatur County (west)
 Fugit Township, Decatur County (northwest)

Major highways
 Interstate 74
 Indiana State Road 46
 Indiana State Road 229

Cemeteries
The township contains one cemetery, Holy Family.

Education
Ray Township residents may obtain a free library card from the Batesville Memorial Public Library in Batesville.

References
 United States Census Bureau cartographic boundary files
 U.S. Board on Geographic Names

External links
 Indiana Township Association
 United Township Association of Indiana

Townships in Franklin County, Indiana
Townships in Indiana